The 1937 Donington Grand Prix was a Grand Prix motor race held on 2 October 1937 at the Donington Park circuit.

Race report
In the race, Hermann Lang led the first few laps but retired with a broken damper, and British driver Richard Seaman followed shortly after. The lead changed hands several times between Manfred von Brauchitsch, Bernd Rosemeyer and Rudolf Caracciola. Whilst in the lead for a second time, von Brauchitsch suffered a puncture, allowing Rosemeyer to pass him and lead the race while his Auto Union teammates could not keep up with the tricky mid-engined car. Rosemeyer stayed in the lead until the end and took the win after 80 laps, with four other German cars completing the full distance within the next minutes before the race was flagged off for good.

In "When the Germans came to Donington", Rodney Walkerley
describes the impression the German cars made on British journalists who had not yet witnessed them, being confident in the skills and machinery of British racers.

Away beyond the woods we heard the approaching scream of a well-tuned E.R.A. and down the winding slope towards us came Raymond Mays. He changed down, braked, skirted round the Hairpin and was gone.

"There's the winner," remarked one of my friends. "Knows this course backwards."

Half a minute later came the deeper note of a 2.9-litre Maserati, and "B. Bira" (Prince Birabongse of Siam, Mays’ nearest rival and a new star in the racing firmament) shot past us, cornering with that precision which marked him as the master he was.

"Or him," said another.

We waited again. Then they came.

Far away in the distance we heard an angry, deep-throated roaring – as someone once remarked, like hungry lions impatient for the arena. A few moments later, Manfred von Brauchitsch, red helmeted, brought a great, silver projectile snaking down the hill, and close behind, his teammate Rudolf Caracciola, then at the height of his great career. The two cars took the hairpin, von Brauchitsch almost sideways, and rocketed away out of sight with long plumes of rubber smoke trailing from their huge rear tyres, in a deafening crash of sound.

The startled Pressmen gazed at each other, awe-struck.

"Strewth," gasped one of them, "so that's what they're like!"

That was what they were like.

Entries

Notes:
 Arthur Dobson was entered with both number 10 and 19.
 Christian Kautz was a reserve driver but took part in practice sessions.
 Charles Martin used both an ERA and a Maserati during the practice sessions.

Classification

Starting grid positions

Notes:
 Arthur Hyde withdrew before qualifying, thinking he was too slow.

Race

References

Session results taken from:

External links

 When the Germans came to Donington

Donington Grand Prix
Donington Grand Prix
Donington Grand Prix
Don